Following is a list of Brazilian architects.

 Affonso Eduardo Reidy (1909-1964)
 Alexandre Chan (born 1942)
 Ana Luiza Nobre (born 1964)
 Angelo Bucci
 Arthur Casas
 Assis Reis (1926-2011)
 Eugênio Szilagyi
 Franz Heep (1902-1978)
 Igor de Vetyemy (born 1981)
 Joaquim Guedes (1932-2008)
 Lina Bo Bardi (1914-1992)
 Lota de Macedo Soares (1910-1967)
 Lúcio Costa (1902-1998)
 Marcio Kogan (born 1952)
 Oscar Niemeyer (1907-2012)
 Paulo Mendes da Rocha (1928–2021)

References

See also

 List of architects
 List of Brazilians

Brazilian
Architects